Marko Basara (Serbian Cyrillic: Марко Басара; born July 27, 1984) is a Serbian football midfielder.

He had previously played with Serbian clubs FK Teleoptik, FK Beograd, FK Voždovac, FK Čukarički, Bosnian NK Jedinstvo Bihać, FK Kozara Gradiška, FK Radnik Bijeljina, Hungarian BFC Siófok, Romanian CS Pandurii Târgu Jiu and Iranian Tractor Sazi F.C.

References

External links

1984 births
Living people
Association football midfielders
BFC Siófok players
CS Pandurii Târgu Jiu players
Expatriate footballers in Bosnia and Herzegovina
Expatriate footballers in Hungary
Expatriate footballers in Romania
Expatriate footballers in Iran
Serbian SuperLiga players
Premier League of Bosnia and Herzegovina players
Nemzeti Bajnokság I players
Liga I players
Persian Gulf Pro League players
FK Čukarički players
FK Kozara Gradiška players
FK Teleoptik players
FK Voždovac players
NK Jedinstvo Bihać players
HŠK Zrinjski Mostar players
NK Vitez players
FK Zemun players
OFK Beograd players
Serbian expatriate footballers
Serbian expatriate sportspeople in Bosnia and Herzegovina
Serbian expatriate sportspeople in Hungary
Serbian expatriate sportspeople in Romania
Serbian footballers
Footballers from Belgrade